The 1978 season was São Paulo's 49th season since club's existence.

Statistics

Scorers

Overall 
{|class="wikitable"
|-
|Games played || 87 (6 Copa Libertadores, 26 Campeonato Brasileiro, 52 Campeonato Paulista, 3 Friendly match)
|-
|Games won || 36 (1 Copa Libertadores, 10 Campeonato Brasileiro, 24 Campeonato Paulista, 1 Friendly match)
|-
|Games drawn || 28 (3 Copa Libertadores, 8 Campeonato Brasileiro, 15 Campeonato Paulista, 2 Friendly match)
|-
|Games lost || 23 (2 Copa Libertadores, 8 Campeonato Brasileiro, 13 Campeonato Paulista, 0 Friendly match)
|-
|Goals scored || 126
|-
|Goals conceded || 80
|-
|Goal difference || +46
|-
|Best result || 6–1 (H) v Ríver - Campeonato Brasileiro - 1978.04.06
|-
|Worst result || 1–4 (A) v Santos - Campeonato Paulista - 1979.01.28
|-
|Most appearances || 
|-
|Top scorer || Milton (22)
|-

Friendlies

Copa dos Campeões da Copa Brasil

Official competitions

Copa Libertadores

Record

Campeonato Brasileiro

Record

Campeonato Paulista

Record

External links
official website 

Association football clubs 1978 season
1978
1978 in Brazilian football